Fayroll (Russian: "Файролл", or "Акула пера в Мире Файролла") is a series of fantasy novels written by Russian author Andrey Vasilyev. The series currently includes twelve books chronicling the adventures of a society reporter, Harriton Nikiforov, in the virtual game world of Fayroll.

The English translation (done by Jared Firth) of the first novel was released in February 2017.

Author info 
Andrey Vasilyev, Андрей Васильев, (born 31 July 1973) is a Moscow-based author writing in the emerging LitRPG genre. He currently has 49 books published, most in e-book format.

Plot overview 
The main character, Harriton Nikiforov, is a journalist who is given the assignment to test Fayroll, a virtual reality game developed and controlled by Raidion Corporation, and write a series of promotional articles on the subject. Supplied with a free virtual-reality capsule and a free game subscription, he embarks on a seemingly endless chain of incredible virtual quests and adrenaline-fueled adventures.

Setting 
The main storyline unfolds in a variety of virtual game locations encompassing two continents and all climate zones. These locations represent original yet recognizable fantasy settings complete with medieval-style towns, mob-infested catacombs, Oriental caravan-serais, Viking-patrolled seashores, rainforests, woodlands, and wetlands.

Another part of the story – the one dealing with the protagonist's "real" life – is mostly confined to Harriton's apartment, with occasional outings to downtown Moscow, his offices, or Radeon headquarters.

Real-life characters 
Harriton Nikiforov (a.k.a. Hagen the Warrior when in a game) – a journalist and a willy-nilly explorer of the captivating Fayroll world.
Elvira (Elya) – Harriton’s ex-girlfriend
Victoria (Vika) – Harriton’s colleague and a new girlfriend
Mammoth – Harriton’s former boss
Valyaev and Zimin – Raidion’s top managers
Fat Willie – see Wild Willie
Shelestova- one of Harriton’s top employees

Fayroll game characters 
Elina the Wise – the leader of the Thunderbirds clan
Gray Witch – the leader of the Hounds of Death clan
Wild Willie – Harry’s real-life pal and a Fayroll ally
Eiliana the West – an NPC dryad, the Keeper of the Western Ranges
Ogina the East, an NPC dryad of the East and Eiliana’s sister
Gerda (see also …) – a powerful NPC witch Harry keeps bumping into
Euiikh – a low-level lowlife PK and Harry’s favorite foe
Gunther von Richter – a Knight of the Tearful Goddess Order and Harry’s unlikely NPC friend

Genre 
The series is attributed to the so-called LitRPG genre which is short for "Literary works based on Role-Playing Games" and may be best described as "a mixture of Sci-Fi, Sword and Sorcery and MMORPG elements within the books" (Goodreads).

Series structure and publishing history 
The series currently includes 11 books in English and 14 books in Russian:

- Book 1. More Than a Game (available in eBook and paperback)

The English edition by Lithunters formerly Litworld was released in February 2017.

- Book 2. The Road East (available in eBook and paperback)

- Book 3. Winds of Fate (available in eBook and paperback)

- Book 4. The Gong and Chalice (available in eBook and paperback)

- Book 5. Sicilian Defense (available in eBook and paperback)

- Book 6. Under the Black Flag (available in eBook only)

- Book 7. Different Sides (available in eBook only)

- Book 8. Crown and the Key (available in eBook only)

- Book 9. Word and Steel (available in eBook only)

- Book 10. The Right to Choose (available in eBook only)

- Book 11. The Blades of the Borderlands (available in eBook only)

The below titles were being translated into English, with an expected release schedule of every 2 to 5 months. However, Lithunters formerly Litworld has stopped publishing books and shut down their website. Their last press release was released 29 April 2018 regarding a misprint in the e-book format of Book 9.  Their last Facebook post was in July 2020 with no information on their possible closure.  (Doesn't look like further books will be written (translated to English), orphaned 2018 series domain no longer valid)

- Book 12.  Condescension (in three volumes)

- Book 13. Squaring the Circle (in four volumes)

- Book 14. Loop of Destinies (Volume 1 published 16 September 2021, Volume 2 and on being written)

All of the books in the Fayroll series are available for either purchase or free download in Russian. The free downloads are drafted text that lacks the finishing polish, while the purchased copies are the final product.

Reviews and awards 
The series have received a fair share of critical acclaim as well as fan raves. The seventh novel, Taking Sides (Russian: «Разные стороны», was nominated as ‘The Best Book of the Year 2014’ by FantLab portal. The first book of the series was ranked as the #4 of 12 all time best LitRPG by Levelup Publishing.

References

External links 
 Official webpage (Orphaned): http://fayrollseries.com
 Critical reviews (English): http://www.reditalgroup.com/2017/more-than-a-game-by-andrey-vasilyev-book-review
 Critical reviews (Russian): https://fantlab.ru/autor39094/responsespage1
 More Than a Game (Book 1 of Fayroll series) on Amazon.com: https://www.amazon.com/More-Than-Game-Fayroll-Book-ebook/dp/B06VVFDXVN/ref=asap_bc?ie=UTF8
 Andrey Vasilyev on Amazon.com: https://www.amazon.com/Andrey-Vasilyev/e/B06WGQ54SX/ref=dp_byline_cont_ebooks_1
 Andrey Vasilyev on AuthorToday: https://author.today/u/reineke2013
 Draft of Fayroll Books in Russian: http://flibusta.site/s/31552

Novel series
Russian fantasy novels